Brandon Wong may refer to:

 Brandon Wong (actor) (born 1971), Malaysian actor based in Singapore
 Anthony Brandon Wong (born 1965), Australian actor